Jenny Wai Ching Kwan  (born 1967) is a Canadian politician who is the member of Parliament (MP) for Vancouver East. A member of the New Democratic Party (NDP), Kwan was elected to the House of Commons in 2015.

She was previously a member of the Legislative Assembly (MLA), representing Vancouver-Mount Pleasant from 1996 to 2015 with the British Columbia (BC) NDP, and was a provincial cabinet minister from 1998 to 2001. Kwan entered politics in 1993, when she was elected to the Vancouver City Council.

Background
Kwan emigrated to Canada at age nine with her family from British Hong Kong. She speaks English, French, and Cantonese.

Kwan graduated from Simon Fraser University with a Bachelor of Arts in Criminology. She started her career as a community legal advocate in Vancouver's Downtown Eastside before entering politics.

Political career

Municipal politics (1993–1996) 
In 1993, Kwan at age 26 was elected as the youngest-ever member of Vancouver City Council. She was the sole representative of the Coalition of Progressive Electors throughout her term on council.

Provincial politics (1996–2015) 
In 1996, Kwan entered provincial politics. After being nominated, she was elected as the MLA for Vancouver-Mount Pleasant, in East Vancouver. She succeeded Premier Mike Harcourt, who at the time had just resigned over a series of serious fundraising scandals, including the Bingogate Scandal.

In 2001, Kwan, along with Joy MacPhail, was one of only two NDP MLAs to survive the party's electoral collapse in the 2001 British Columbia general election at the hands of a BC Liberal landslide upset. She was re-elected in 2005, 2009, and 2013.

Leadership controversy, December 2010
In December 2010, Kwan released a statement to the media criticizing NDP leader Carole James, and calling for an immediate leadership convention, after party candidates suffered defeat in the 2009 election. In response to Kwan's statement, James called an emergency caucus session to address opposition to her continued leadership. Before the caucus meeting was held, however, James announced her resignation as party leader. While Kwan was accused of self-interest, at the time she claimed to have no plans to run for the leadership of the party.

Portland Hotel Society controversy, March 2014

In March 2014, an audit of the Portland Hotel Society showed that Kwan's ex-husband, Dan Small, had improperly expensed the cost of a family Disneyland trip to the society. At the time of the trip, Kwan had still been married to Small and had participated in the trip with their children.  When the audit became public, Kwan held a press conference where she denied any knowledge that the society had paid for the trip, and said she would reimburse the society. Following the conference, Kwan took a brief leave of absence.

Member of Parliament (2015–present) 

In January 2015, Kwan announced that she would be seeking the NDP nomination in Vancouver East for the 2015 federal election.  Mable Elmore was also seeking the party's nomination in the riding. Kwan was nominated on March 22, and sought to replace Libby Davies as the MP for the riding. She was elected to the House of Commons in October 2015, defeating Liberal Party candidate Edward Wong and Conservative Party candidate James Low by a wide margin. On November 12, she was appointed as her party's critic for immigration, refugees and citizenship. She was re-elected in the 2019 federal election.

Electoral record

Federal

Provincial

See also
 Chinese Canadians in British Columbia

References

External links

 Official Biography, Legislative Assembly of British Columbia
 Biography, New Democratic Party
 

1967 births
Living people
British Columbia New Democratic Party MLAs
Women government ministers of Canada
Women members of the House of Commons of Canada
Hong Kong emigrants to Canada
Members of the Executive Council of British Columbia
Members of the House of Commons of Canada from British Columbia
Naturalized citizens of Canada
New Democratic Party MPs
Simon Fraser University alumni
Coalition of Progressive Electors councillors
Women MLAs in British Columbia
Women municipal councillors in Canada
21st-century Canadian politicians
21st-century Canadian women politicians